Kuruluş: Osman is a Turkish historical drama television series created by Mehmet Bozdağ and starring Burak Özçivit. The successful series has received many awards. Burak Özçivit won eight awards for his role in the series and Özge Törer won two awards for her role in the series.Yıldız Çağrı Atiksoy won one award for her role in the series .Below is a list of awards and nominations received by Kurulus: Osman.

Istanbul University Project Club (Golden 61 Awards)
Burak Özçivit won an award for Best Male Actor of the Year in the Istanbul University Project Club (Golden 61 Awards) in 2020. 

In 2021, Kuruluş: Osman won three more awards; Best Producer of the Year to Bozdağ Film, Best TV Series of the Year to Kuruluş: Osman and Best Male Actor of the Year to Burak Özçivit. Özge Törer and Burak Özçivit were nominated for Best TV Couple for their roles as Osman Bey and Bala Hatun.

International Venice TV Awards
Kuruluş: Osman won an award in the 2020 International Venice TV Awards for the category, Best Serie, becoming the first Turkish series in history to be awarded in these awards.

Golden Palm Awards
The Golden Palm Awards are considered one of the most prestigious and most important awards for films. Winners are selected based on an online vote in four main categories: media, cinema, music, and television series. The seventh annual ceremony, in which approximately three million people voted, was postponed from March 23rd to November 2020 due to the COVID-19 pandemic. The series won an award in the category, TV Series of the Year. The producer, Mehmet Bozdağ, also won the Best Producer of the Year award.

In 2021, the series won four more awards: TV Series of the Year, Best Producer of the Year to Mehmet Bozdağ, and Best Actor of the Year to Burak Özçivit and also best TV series actress to Yıldız Çağrı Atiksoy.

Crystal Globe Awards
The Crystal Globe Awards are based on a people's vote. Four members of the series' cast won an award at a ceremony held at Grand Cevahir.

Media Oscar 
Burak Özçivit won an award for Best Male Actor of the Year in the Media Oscar awarded by the Association of Radio and Television Journalists in Turkey.

Quality Magazine Awards 2021

Eurasian Consumer Protection Association Award

European Awards

Crystal Diamond Awards

Moon Life Awards

Ayakli Gazete TV Stars Awards

See also
 List of Kuruluş: Osman episodes
 List of Kuruluş: Osman characters
 List of awards and nominations received by Diriliş: Ertuğrul

References

Diriliş: Ertuğrul and Kuruluş: Osman
Lists_of_awards_by_television_series